Dimitrovgrad, formerly Melekess until 1972, is a city in Ulyanovsk Oblast, Russia. It is the administrative center of Melekessky District, although it is not within the district and is an independent city. The city is located in the Volga Region, at the confluence of the Melekesska River and the Bolshoy Cheremshan River, a tributary of the Volga River. Dimitrovgrad has a population of  the second-largest city in Ulyanovsk Oblast, after Ulyanovsk.

History
The city was founded in 1714 as a village for workers of the local distillery. By 1897 its population had grown to 8,500, and in 1919 it was granted town status. Until 1972, the city's name was Melekess, after the local Melekesska River which runs through the town. On July 15, 1972, Melekess was renamed to Dimitrovgrad, celebrating the posthumous 90th birthday of Georgi Dimitrov, the first leader of the communist People's Republic of Bulgaria.

Administrative and municipal status
Within the framework of administrative divisions, Dimitrovgrad serves as the administrative center of Melekessky District, even though it is not a part of it. As an administrative division, it is incorporated separately as the city of oblast significance of Dimitrovgrad—an administrative unit with the status equal to that of the districts. As a municipal division, the city of oblast significance of Dimitrovgrad is incorporated as Dimitrovgrad Urban Okrug.

Economy
Dimitrovgrad's industry also includes an auto parts manufacturer (Dimitrovgrad Automobile Parts Plant, carburetors, fuel pumps), a carpet manufacturing plant (Kovrotex), and a chemical processing equipment manufacturer (Dimitrovgradkhimmash and Zenith Khimmash).

Education and culture

The city has a variety of educational institutions. It has twenty-two secondary schools, three lyceums, one gymnasium, three branches of state universities, and two branches of private higher educational institutions. The city also has the State Scientific Center of Russian Federation, Research Institute of Atomic Reactors.

There also is a drama theater in Dimitrovgrad.

Sports
 The bandy team Cheremshan plays in Supreme League, the second-highest national division. At the 2016 Bandy World Championship the quarterfinal between Russia and the United States was played in Dimitrovgrad at Stadium Stroitel (Строитель), as well as the group stage match between Netherlands and Germany in Division B. Artificial ice was supposed to be constructed for the occasion, which did not happen.
 Match first qualifying round UEFA Women's Under-17 Championship 2014: - 3-0.

Demographics

Ethnic groups
As of the 2010 Census: Russians - 76.2%, Tatars - 13.2%, Chuvash - 5.3%, Mordovians - 1.7%, Ukrainians - 1.0%, others - 2.5%

Notable residents
Stanislav Donets
Victor Ovcharenko

Twin towns – sister cities

Dimitrovgrad is twinned with:
 Lida, Belarus
 Dimitrovgrad, Bulgaria
 Guliston, Tajikistan

Gallery

References

Notes

Sources

External links

Official website of Dimitrovgrad 
Dimitrovgrad Business Directory 

 
Cities and towns in Ulyanovsk Oblast
Populated places established in 1714
Naukograds
Georgi Dimitrov
Stavropolsky Uyezd (Samara Governorate)